Many works of fiction are set in the London Underground system or use it as a major plot element. This is a partial list.

Novels

Ben Aaronovitch: Whispers Under Ground (2012)
Margery Allingham: Death of a Ghost (1934). The climax of this murder mystery takes place on the Underground.
Julian Barnes: Metroland (1981)
Dan Brown: The Da Vinci Code (2003)
Agatha Christie: The Man in the Brown Suit (1924). The mystery begins with the death of a passenger at Hyde Park Corner station.
Tom Clancy: Patriot Games (1987; also 1992 film)
 Christopher Fowler: Bryant and May off the Rails: A Peculiar Crimes Unit Mystery (2011)
Neil Gaiman: Neverwhere (1997; also 1996 television series)
 Christopher Golden and Tim Lebbon: Mind the Gap: A Novel of the Hidden Cities (2008)
Lisa Goldstein: Dark Cities Underground (1999)
James Herbert: The Rats (1974; also 1982 film Deadly Eyes)
Tobias Hill: Underground (1999). Involves disused South Kentish Town Underground station.
Russell Hoban: The Underground is a character in Kleinzeit.
Geoffrey Household: Rogue Male (1939). A pivotal pursuit of the protagonist by an enemy agent sees them repeatedly using the shuttle service on the Aldwych branch line. A chase through Aldwych station ends with the enemy agent's death by electrocution on the track.
Aldous Huxley: Point Counter Point (1928) An early, character-defining scene takes place on the Underground.
Lawrence Leonard: The Horn of Mortal Danger (1980)
Keith Lowe: Tunnel Vision (2001)
Ian McEwan: Atonement (2001). One of the main protagonists Cecilia Tallis dies during the Blitz in Balham Tube Station.
Kit Pedler and Gerry Davis: Mutant 59: The Plastic Eater (1971)
Geoff Ryman: 253 (1997). Set on Bakerloo line.
Barbara Vine: King Solomon's Carpet (1991)
Nigel West: The Blue List (1989). This espionage story culminates in the war-time bunker built in the uncompleted tunnels of North End station, although this is incorrectly identified as Paddock, a separate bunker in Dollis Hill.
Conrad Williams: London Revenant (2004)
Catherine Storr: The Underground Conspiracy (1987), children's/teen novel. A teenage girl who travels on the Underground for fun soon becomes a pawn in an elaborate plan to use the Underground to transport drugs.

Short stories
John Betjeman: "South Kentish Town" (1951)
Agatha Christie: "The Labours of Hercules" (1947). At the beginning of the final story, The Capture of Cerberus, Poirot meets the Countess Vera Rossakoff on the escalators at Piccadilly Circus station.
Arthur Conan Doyle: "The Adventure of the Bruce-Partington Plans" (1908) (e-text)
Jeremy Dyson: "City Deep" (2000)
Christopher Fowler: "Crocodile Lady"
Samuel Selvon: "Working the Transport" (1957)
Alice Thompson: "Killing Time" (1990)
Anthea Turner & Wendy Turner: "Underneath the Underground"
Connie Willis: "The Winds of Marble Arch" (1999) (online)
John Wyndham: "Confidence Trick" Jizzle (1954)

Films
Underground (1928)
Bulldog Jack (1935)
Passport to Pimlico (1949)
Train of Events (1949)
Seven Days to Noon (1950)
Georgy Girl (1966)
Press for Time (1966)
Daleks - Invasion Earth 2150 AD (1966)
Quatermass and the Pit (1967) — fictional station Hobbs End
Battle of Britain (1969)
The Bed-Sitting Room (1969)
Death Line (aka Raw Meat) (1972)
Hanover Street (1979)
An American Werewolf in London (1981)
Lifeforce (1985)
The Fourth Protocol (1987)
Superman IV: The Quest for Peace (1987)
Hidden City (1988)
The Krays (1990)
Patriot Games (1994)
Mission: Impossible (1996)
Secrets & Lies (1996)
The Wings of the Dove (1997)
Croupier (1998)
Sliding Doors (1998)
Tube Tales (1999)
Virtual Sexuality (1999)
The End of the Affair (1999)
Billy Elliot (2000)
Bridget Jones's Diary (2001)
Die Another Day (2002) — fictional station Vauxhall Cross
Reign of Fire (2002)
28 Days Later (2002)
Mujhse Dosti Karoge! (2002)
Bend It Like Beckham (2002)
Love Actually (2003)
Code 46 (2003)
The Mother (2003)
Shaun of the Dead (2004) — fictional station Crouch End
If Only (2004)
Touch of Pink (2004)
Creep (2004)
Agent Cody Banks 2: Destination London (2004)
The Football Factory (2004)
Green Street (2005)
V for Vendetta (2005)
The Good Shepherd (2006)
28 Weeks Later (2007)
Harry Potter and the Order of the Phoenix (2007)
Atonement (2007)
The Bourne Ultimatum (2007)
Three and Out (2008)
The Edge of Love (2008)
The Escapist (2008)
Skyfall (2012) — Temple and fictional train derailment
Darkest Hour (2017)

Television

Doctor Who
The Dalek Invasion of Earth (1964)
The Web of Fear (1967)
Invasion of the Dinosaurs (1974)
The Trial of a Time Lord (Parts 1-4) (1986)
"Rose" (2005) — fictional station

Others
Game On
The setting for 'The Lab' HQ of The Tomorrow People (1973–1979)
The setting of EastEnders features the fictitious Walford East tube station replacing Bromley-by-Bow.
CGI "Underground Ernie"
Primeval (2007)
Thunderbirds featured Tube stations, but they were deserted due to the series being set in the future.
Spooks (series 7) (2008)
The F Word (2008)
Mr Selfridge (2013)
Sherlock (2014)

Music videos
Howard Jones: "New Song" (1984) - Holborn Station
Boris Gardiner: "I Want To Wake Up With You" (1986) – Westbourne Park Station
Leftfield: "Release the Pressure" (1992)
Roxette: "Fireworks" (1994) — Piccadilly Circus Station, external
The Prodigy: "Firestarter" (1996) — Aldwych Station
Suede: "Saturday Night" (1997) — Holborn Station, disused platform and tunnel
Aqua: "Turn Back Time" (1998) — Holborn and Bank Station
Chemical Brothers: "Believe" (2005) — Goodge Street and Maida Vale Station
Madonna: "Hung Up" (2005) — Tube stock, Jubilee line between Charing Cross (disused Jubilee line platform) and West Hampstead
Feeder: "Suffocate" — Monument, Bank, Victoria Station on a District line train
Feeder: "Piece by Piece" — Monument, Bank, Victoria Station on a District line train
Oasis: "Mucky Fingers" (live gig only video) — Piccadilly Circus
Dodgy: "Only A Heartbeat" (2012) — Edgware Road (Bakerloo Branch)
Example: "Whisky Story" (2015) - From Charing Cross Underground Station, emerging up onto Trafalgar Square.

Video games
Broken Sword 2
Call of Duty: Modern Warfare 3
Creep - The Last Tube
The Getaway: Black Monday
Hellgate: London
Tomb Raider III
Uncharted 3: Drake's Deception
World of Subways 3
ZombiU

See also
List of fictional rapid transit stations
List of television shows set in London
London in film
New York City Subway in popular culture

References

External links
Going Underground's – London Underground in Film and TV
Nick Cooper's – London Underground in Film and TV

London
London Underground-related fiction
Fiction
London Underground in popular culture
Underground-related fiction